The Southern Derby is a fan-based U.S. professional soccer cup competition between USL Championship (USLC) teams based in the South-Atlantic region of the United States (North Carolina, South Carolina, and Georgia.). It was founded in 2000.  The Southern Derby trophy is currently held by the Charlotte Independence.

The Southern Derby was created by the fans of the teams involved to promote a friendly competition and rivalry along the clubs involved and encourage fans to travel to away matches. The Southern Derby is perhaps the first cup competition of its kind in American professional soccer.  It is common in nature with other fan cup competitions which originated in the United Soccer Leagues such as the Cascadia Cup, the James River Cup, and the Voyageurs Cup.  It is also similar to Major League Soccer trophy competitions such as the Atlantic Cup, the Brimstone Cup, the Lamar Hunt Pioneer Cup, the Rocky Mountain Cup, and the Texas Derby.

Southern Derby Commemorative Cup
The Southern Derby Commemorative Cup is the trophy awarded annually to the winner of the Southern Derby.  The trophy consists of a wooden base attached to a silver-plated, two-handled cup.  The inscription on the base of the trophy reads The Southern Derby: Founded A-League Season 2000 in Atlanta, Charleston, & Raleigh by those who love the Game.

The cup was purchased through funds raised by the supporters club of the inaugural three clubs involved in the competition.  The Fans own Southern Derby Commemorative Cup which is loaned each year to the holders of the Southern Derby.

Current Clubs
Charleston Battery
Charlotte Independence

History

The first edition of the Southern Derby was contested in 2000 between the A-League (1995-2004) Charleston Battery, the Atlanta Silverbacks, and the Raleigh Capital Express with Raleigh winning the inaugural competition.

The Raleigh Capital Express folded before the 2001 season and the Charlotte Eagles were invited to replace Raleigh in the cup competition. Charlotte won the trophy in their first year in the contest.  The Eagles would continue to compete in the contest in 2002 and 2003 with Atlanta and Charleston winning the competition those years, respectively.

At the end of the 2003 season, Charlotte moved to the USL Second Division leaving the Southern Derby to be played between only Charleston and Atlanta. The Silverbacks won the title outright in 2004 and 2006 and split the title with Charleston in 2005.

In 2007, the Carolina RailHawks (based in Cary, North Carolina and now known as North Carolina FC) joined the USL First Division and was invited to take up Raleigh's original spot in the competition.  Carolina went undefeated in their 2007 Southern Derby campaign capturing the cup in their inaugural season.  The RailHawks successfully defended their title in 2008 and through two seasons had beaten Charleston a remarkable 6 times in 6 games (4 Southern Derby fixtures).

With the Silverbacks taking a hiatus in 2009, the 2009 edition of the Southern Derby Cup was a home-and-away competition between the Charleston Battery and the Carolina RailHawks contested on May 9 and July 11.  Both Charleston and Carolina shared honors in the 2009 Southern Derby Cup.

In 2010 with the Carolina RailHawks joining the NASL and Charleston dropping to USL2, the Carolina fans decided to allow the Charleston Battery to continue with the tradition of the Southern Derby Cup with the Charlotte Eagles as opposed to it sitting idle. Charleston won the Southern Derby Cup in 2010.

The 2011 Southern Derby featured both Charlotte and Charleston once again and added the Wilmington Hammerheads to the competition.  The winner was decided on the last match of the Southern Derby Dates, which happened to be the Charleston vs. Charlotte match on Fox Soccer Channel. Charleston won the 2011 Southern Derby match.

With their return to the United Soccer League (now known as the USL Championship) in 2018, North Carolina FC (formerly the Carolina RailHawks) rejoined the competition alongside former rivals the Charleston Battery and newly minted cross-state opponents the Charlotte Independence.

2020 saw the Charlotte Independence supporter's group Jack's Militia opt-out of the Southern Derby. Due to Covid, the Charleston Battery and North Carolina FC played a "one and done" version of the contest.  The Charleston Battery won the single match, 3–0.

In 2021, North Carolina FC self-relegated to USL League 1 leaving Charleston and Charlotte to contest for the Cup once again.  With the emergence of the new Charlotte Independence supporters group, the Mecklenburg Reserves, the rivalry was once again back on.  The winner of the 2021 Southern Derby Cup will be played over two legs, the first at Charleston Battery's home pitch, Patriots Point on July 23 and the second leg in Charlotte's home stadium, Memorial Stadium on October 16.  The Charlotte Independence won their first Southern Derby in 2021, splitting the games with Charleston, but outscoring Charleston 5–3 on aggregate goals.

The Rules

Rules for the 2020 Southern Derby Cup were changed due to COVID-19.
The single match between the Charleston Battery and North Carolina FC will be a one and done competition.  In the case of a draw, the teams shall be declared co-champions and the Charleston Battery will retain physical control of the Cup as the 2019 champions.

The system of play shall be the league system, with each team playing two matches (home/away) against each of the teams.
The Matches composing the Southern Derby will normally be the last home and away matches of each team during the regular season unless otherwise negotiated by the members of the respective supporters club prior to the start of the season.
Points will be awarded on the 3-1-0 systems.  3 points for a win, 1 point for a tie, and 0 points for a loss.  Overtime wins are treated like regulation wins an awarded 3 points.
The winner of the Southern Derby shall be the team having the greater number of points obtained in all the designated Derby matches.
If two or more teams are equal on the basis of the above criteria, the tie-breaker shall be determined as follows:
Goal difference in all the Derby matches.
Greater number of goals scored in all Derby matches.
Greater number of points obtained in all Derby matches between the teams concerned.
Goal difference resulting from all Derby matches between the teams concerned.
Greater number of goals scored in all the Derby matches between the teams concerned.

Southern Derby Winners
2000: Raleigh Capital Express
2001: Charlotte Eagles
2002: Atlanta Silverbacks
2003: Charleston Battery
2004: Atlanta Silverbacks
2005: Charleston Battery and Atlanta Silverbacks (co-champions)
2006: Atlanta Silverbacks
2007: Carolina RailHawks
2008: Carolina RailHawks
2009: Carolina RailHawks and Charleston Battery (co-champions)
2010: Charleston Battery
2011: Charleston Battery
2012: Charlotte Eagles
2013: Charlotte Eagles
2014: Wilmington Hammerheads
2015: Charleston Battery
2016: Charleston Battery
2017: Charleston Battery
2018: North Carolina FC
2019: Charleston Battery
2020: Charleston Battery
2021: Charlotte Independence

Current Results

Standings

Matches

Past Results

See also 
 James River Cup
 Voyageurs Cup

External links
 2009 Derby Standings at USLFans.com
 2008 Derby Standings at USLFans.com
 2007 Derby Standings at USLFans.com
 2006 Derby Standings at USLFans.com
 2005 Derby Standings at USLFans.com
 2004 Derby Standings at USLFans.com
 2003 Derby Standings at USLFans.com
 2002 Derby Standings at USLFans.com
 2001 Derby Standings at USLFans.com
 2000 Derby Standings at USLFans.com

Soccer in Georgia (U.S. state)
Soccer in North Carolina
Soccer in South Carolina
Recurring sporting events established in 2000
Soccer rivalries in the United States
USL First Division
USL Championship
2000 establishments in the United States